Browns Valley is a city in Traverse County, Minnesota, United States, adjacent to the South Dakota border. The population was 558 at the 2020 census.
 
Browns Valley lies along the Little Minnesota River between the northern end of Big Stone Lake and the southern end of Lake Traverse, which is separated from the Little Minnesota River by a low and narrow continental divide that skirts the northern edge of town. The city, both lakes, and the river lie in the Traverse Gap, the bed of ancient, south-flowing Glacial River Warren, the outlet to Glacial Lake Agassiz which, when drained, became the valley of the north-flowing Red River of the North.

History
Browns Valley was first settled in 1867 by Joseph R. Brown, and named for him. The settlement was platted in 1878. A post office was established in the community in 1867 under the name Lake Traverse. The post office was renamed Browns Valley in 1872. Two properties in the city are listed on the National Register of Historic Places: the 1864 Fort Wadsworth Agency and Scout Headquarters Building within Sam Brown Memorial State Wayside and the 1916 Browns Valley Carnegie Library.

Geography
Browns Valley is rested in an old glacier path.

Browns Valley Lies in the center of Traverse Gap, a valley and ancient riverbed. This valley is also home to a continental divide. The divide is the southernmost point of the Northern Divide between the watersheds of the Arctic and Atlantic oceans. The area is also home to Browns Valley Man, the oldest human remains found in Minnesota. The remains were found in Traverse Gap and carbon dated to about 9,000 years ago.

Minnesota Highways 27 and 28 are two of the main routes in the community.

Climate
The Browns Valley weather station records some of Minnesota's highest summer temperatures; on July 31, 2007, a high of 107 °F (42 °C) was registered.

Demographics

2010 census
As of the census of 2010, there were 589 people, 247 households, and 141 families residing in the city. The racial makeup of the city was 75.2% White, 21.4% Native American, 0.5% Asian, 0.5% from other races, and 2.4% from two or more races. Hispanic or Latino of any race were 2.7% of the population.

There were 247 households, of which 23.5% had children under the age of 18 living with them, 38.5% were married couples living together, 13.0% had a female householder with no husband present, 5.7% had a male householder with no wife present, and 42.9% were non-families. 40.5% of all households were made up of individuals, and 24.3% had someone living alone who was 65 years of age or older. The average household size was 2.23 and the average family size was 2.97.

The median age in the city was 48.3 years. 22.2% of residents were under the age of 18; 5.4% were between the ages of 18 and 24; 18.7% were from 25 to 44; 23.7% were from 45 to 64; and 30.1% were 65 years of age or older. The gender makeup of the city was 46.0% male and 54.0% female.

2000 census
As of the census of 2000, there were 690 people, 285 households, and 171 families residing in the city. The racial makeup of the city was 82.61% White, 15.80% Native American, 0.43% Asian, 0.14% Pacific Islander, 0.14% from other races, and 0.87% from two or more races. Hispanic or Latino of any race were 1.74% of the population.

There were 285 households, out of which 26.3% had children under the age of 18 living with them, 45.3% were married couples living together, 9.5% had a female householder with no husband present, and 40.0% were non-families. 36.5% of all households were made up of individuals, and 21.4% had someone living alone who was 65 years of age or older. The average household size was 2.29 and the average family size was 3.02.

In the city, the population was spread out, with 24.5% under the age of 18, 7.4% from 18 to 24, 17.8% from 25 to 44, 19.3% from 45 to 64, and 31.0% who were 65 years of age or older. The median age was 45 years. For every 100 females, there were 86.5 males. For every 100 females age 18 and over, there were 82.2 males.

The median income for a household in the city was $26,563, and the median income for a family was $30,208. Males had a median income of $25,500 versus $20,139 for females. The per capita income for the city was $15,062. About 10.3% of families and 14.4% of the population were below the poverty line, including 16.5% of those under age 18 and 11.0% of those age 65 or over.

Politics

Notable people
Charles Burnett, officer in Royal Air Force and Royal Australian Air Force during World War I and World War II
Osborne Cowles, basketball coach
Charles M. Dale, 66th governor of New Hampshire
Kathy Skroch, member of the North Dakota House of Representatives
Arthur C. Townley, politician

Flooding

In March 2007, Browns Valley was flooded from the north and west by the Little Minnesota River. One hundred people had to be evacuated from their homes, a significant percentage of the town's population. The damage was significant enough to warrant a visit from Governor Tim Pawlenty and Congressman Collin Peterson.

References

External links
 Official site of the City of Browns Valley, MN 56219
  Aerial photographs of March 2007 flooding of Traverse Gap, showing flooding of Browns Valley.

Cities in Minnesota
Cities in Traverse County, Minnesota